Oenothera macrocarpa (syn. Oenothera missouriensis), the bigfruit evening primrose, Ozark sundrops, Missouri evening primrose, or Missouri primrose, is a species of flowering plant in the evening primrose family Onagraceae, native to northeast Mexico and the south-central United States, where it is found in calcareous prairies and limestone outcrops.

Description 
They have either smooth margins or broadly spaced teeth and are hairy.

They are produced in great numbers from early to mid summer. The flowers last for one day, opening in the evening and closing the following morning.

Taxonomy
There are five commonly accepted varieties. These are: 
O. macrocarpa var. fremontii - restricted to Kansas and southern Nebraska
O. macrocarpa var. incana - southern Kansas, western Oklahoma and northern Texas 
O. macrocarpa var. macrocarpa - the most widespread; Texas to the Ozark Mountains, with disjunct populations in Tennessee's Nashville Basin
O. macrocarpa var. mexicana - known only from Coahuila, Mexico
O. macrocarpa var. oklahomensis - southern Kansas, Oklahoma and northern Texas

Etymology
The genus name Oenothera is from the Greek for "wine-scented". The specific epithet macrocarpa is also from the Greek, meaning "large fruited".

Distribution and habitat
Oenothera macrocarpa is native to Arkansas, Illinois, Kansas, Missouri, Nebraska, Oklahoma, Tennessee, Texas, and northeast Mexico. Habitats include limestone outcrops, glades, bluffs, rocky prairies, quarries, and roadsides.

Ecology
The flowers are pollinated by night-flying moths, such as sphinx moths (Sphingidae).

Uses
The seed pods are often used in flower arrangements. This plant is also grown in gardens for its flowers. It is suitable as a groundcover in poor, stony soil which does not become waterlogged in winter, in full sun. It has gained the Royal Horticultural Society’s Award of Garden Merit.

References

macrocarpa
Night-blooming plants
Flora of the North-Central United States
Flora of the South-Central United States
Flora of Mexico
Flora of the United States
Ozarks